Shirud is a village in Dhule district of Maharashtra State, India. Its population in 2011 was 8455.

It is famous for temple of Kalika devi (a Hindu Goddess). The temple site is declared as ancient protected site for its ancient natural and historical importance. The temple is built around 1200 A.D. and later renovated during Maratha Regime. The temple and surroundings are highly natural as well as ancient and peaceful. The Temple is visited by a large number of devotees during the auspicious nine days of Navratra. Also an Annual Fair is Organised during the month of February known as Jatraof Khandoba (a Hindu God). During this fair, a number of people come from outside villages for shopping. The fair lasts for ten days.

Shirud is situated on the confluence of two rivers, Bori & Mandur . A small dam is built near the village. Also it is located near to shirud- vinchur choufuli. Shirud is a central market place & educational place for surrounding villages. A weekly bazaar is held every Friday.

References

Villages in Dhule district